HD 268835 (or R66) (30 SM) is one of two stars that were identified by NASA's Spitzer Space Telescope in the Milky Way's nearest neighbor galaxy, the Large Magellanic Cloud (the other being R 126 or HD 37974), as being circled by monstrous dust disks that are theorised to be the origin of planets.

Significance
Both HD 268835 and HD 37974 are classified as hypergiants, very large and very bright. The dust cloud around them surprised astronomers because stars as big as these were thought to be inhospitable to planet formation as they have very strong winds making it difficult/impossible for the dust clouds to "condense" into planets.

"We do not know if planets like those in our solar system are able to form in the highly energetic, dynamic environment of these massive stars, but if they could, their existence would be a short and exciting one" said Charles Beichman, an astronomer at NASA's Jet Propulsion Laboratory and the California Institute of Technology, both in Pasadena, California.

References

 

Stars in the Large Magellanic Cloud
Mensa (constellation)
Luminous blue variables
B-type hypergiants
Large Magellanic Cloud
R66
268835
022989
CD-70 00273
B(e) stars

ko:R 66과 R 126
it:R 66 e R 126